Stanislav Látal (7 May 1919, in Samotišky, near Olomouc – 4 August 1994, in Prague) was a Czech puppet-film maker and animator. He was among the Czech animators Jiří Trnka, Karel Zeman, Hermína Týrlová, Jiří Barta, Břetislav Pojar, and Jan Švankmajer known for their unique style. He has a son, Jiri Jirka Latal

Films
Wedding in the Coral Sea (Svatba v korálovém moři), November 3, 1944
 The Fox and the Pitcher (Liška a džbán), September 9, 1947
 Dog worries (Psí starosti) 1954 
 Kuťásek and Kutilka on a journey (Kuťásek a Kutilka na pouti) April 12, 1956  
 The paver Houska's imp (Plivník dlaždiče Housky 1961  
 How to raise a good child (Jak si opatřit hodné dítě) 1965  
 Otýlie a 1580 kaněk ("Little Otylia and the 1,580 ink blots")  1965
 Nebuďte mamuty ("Don't wake the mammoths") 1967
 Too much tenderness (Příliš mnoho něhy) 1968
 Sunday (Neděle) 1969 
 Rübezahl and the shoemaker (Krakonoš a švec) July 9, 1976
 Adventures of Robinson Crusoe, a Sailor from York (Czech Dobrodružství Robinsona Crusoe, námořníka z Yorku) April 1, 1982
 The water goblin Čepeček (Vodník Čepeček) December 11–17, 1985 (TV series)  
 The Good Soldier Schweik (Osudy dobrého vojáka Švejka) 1986

References

External links

1919 births
1994 deaths
Czech puppeteers
Czech animators
Czech animated film directors
Czech film directors
People from Olomouc District
Czechoslovak film directors